Marcy Darnovsky (born August 4, 1951) is an American policy advocate and author who has extensively spoken and written on the politics of human biotechnology, focusing on their feminist, social justice, human rights, health equity, and public-interest implications.  She completed her Ph.D. in the History of Consciousness program at the University of California, Santa Cruz, and is currently serving as the Executive Director at the Center for Genetics and Society. She is frequently cited by television, radio, and online sources.

References

External links 
 Profile, Center for Genetics and Society.
 The Battle to Patent Your Genes: The Meaning of the Myriad Case, (2009) The American Interest.
 Moral Questions of an Altogether Different Kind, (2010-2-23) Harvard Law and Policy Review.
 The Consequence of Unnatural Selection: 160 Million Missing Girls, (2011-4-22) Ms. Magazine Blog.
 Germline Modification Carries Risk of Major Social Harm, (2008-6-4) Nature.
 Eggs vs. Ethics in Stem Cell Debate, (2005-11-29) The Nation.
 Donor-Conceived Children in Search of their Biological Histories, (2011-3-11) Psychology Today.

1951 births
Living people
American geneticists